Sway may refer to:

Places
 Sway, Hampshire, a village and civil parish in the New Forest in England
 Sway railway station, serving the village

People
 Sway (British musician) (born 1983), British hip hop/grime singer
 Sway Calloway (born 1971), American journalist, rapper, MTV News and radio anchor
 Sway Clarke II, Canadian singer/songwriter
 Espen Lind (born 1971), Norwegian singer who used the stage name Sway
 Jose Penala, Jose "Sway" Penala, appeared on American Idol Season 5
 Susan Wayland (born 1980), German glamour and latex model nicknamed Sway
 Sway (Japanese rapper) (born 1986), Japanese rapper and actor

Art and entertainment

Dance
 Sway (dance), a motion in ballroom dance
 Sway or schunkeln, a side to side motion in beer and music halls

Albums
 Sway (Blue October album), by Blue October
 Sway (Whirr album), by Whirr
 Sway (Tove Styrke album), 2018

Songs
 "¿Quién será?", or "Sway", a 1953 composition performed over the years by Dean Martin, Michael Bublé, Diana Krall, and many others
 "Sway" (Rolling Stones song), a 1971 song by The Rolling Stones
 "Sway" (Bic Runga song), a 1997 song by Bic Runga
 "Sway" (The Kooks song), a 2008 song by The Kooks
 "Sway" (Danielle Bradbery song), a 2017 song by Danielle Bradbery
 "Sway" (Tove Styrke song), a 2018 song by Tove Styrke
 "Sway", a song by Blue October, and the title track to the album Sway
 "Sway", a song by Coal Chamber
 "Sway", a song by Spiritualized from the album Lazer Guided Melodies
 "Sway", a song by The Perishers from the album Let There Be Morning
 "Sway", a song from Believe in Nothing by Paradise Lost
 "Sway", a song from Be Not Nobody by Vanessa Carlton
 "Sway...", a song by Lostprophets from the album Start Something
 "Sway With Me", Bill Haley & His Comets, 1958,  US Decca

Other art and entertainment
 Sway (novel), a 2014 young adult novel by Kat Spears
 Sway, a novel by Zachary Lazar
 Sway (comics), a Marvel character
 Sway (film), a 2006 Japanese movie
 Sex Week at Yale (SWAY) was a biennial event from 2002 to 2012

Other uses
 Sway (Office app), a web-based presentation application by Microsoft
 Sway, one of the linear degrees of freedom in engineering
 Sway (translational motion), one of the translational degrees of freedom of any stiff body (for example a vehicle), describing motion along the transversal axis (from side to side)
 Postural sway, horizontal shift of person's center of gravity while standing (or attempting to stand) still
 Sway AS, a planned 10 MW wind turbine
 Sway bar, a part of an automobile suspension
 USS Sway (AM-120), an Auk-class minesweeper
 Sway (window manager), a Wayland window manager and compositor

See also
Swaay, a 2015 EP by DNCE